Group C of the 2011 Copa América was one of the three groups of competing nations in the 2011 Copa América. It comprised Chile, Mexico, Peru, and Uruguay. Group play ran from 4 to 12 July 2011.

Chile won the group and faced Venezuela—the runners-up of Group B— in the quarter-finals. Uruguay finished second and faced Argentina—the runners-up of Group A—in the quarter-finals. Peru finished third in the group and also as the best third-place finisher in the first stage. They faced Colombia—the winners of Group A—in the quarter-finals. Mexico were the only team from the group to be eliminated in the first round.

Standings

All times are in local, Argentina Time (UTC−03:00).

Uruguay vs Peru

Chile vs Mexico

Uruguay vs Chile

Peru vs Mexico

Chile vs Peru

Uruguay vs Mexico

References

External links
Copa América 2011 Official Site

Group C
Group
Group
Copa
Copa